Positive outcome bias  may refer to:

 Publication bias, the tendency for researchers to publish research which had a positive outcome. "Positive" in this sense means "eventful" as opposed to "uneventful"
 Unrealistic optimism, a bias in prediction in which people overestimate the probability of good things happening to them. "Positive" in this sense means "good" as opposed to "bad" feelings